Janette Hill Knox (January 24, 1845 – July 28, 1920) was an American temperance reformer, suffragist, teacher, author and editor.

Biography
Janette Hill was born in Londonderry, Vermont, January 24, 1845. She was the daughter of Lewis Hill, a reverend of the Vermont Conference of the Methodist Episcopal Church. Her mother's maiden name was Olive Marsh. Hill was reared in a quiet New England clerical home.

Hill went to school in the various towns to which her father's itinerant assignments took the family. In 1869, after two years of seminary school, she graduated as valedictorian of her class from the Vermont Conference Female College in Montpelier (now, Vermont College of Fine Arts).

On January 9, 1871, in Craftsbury, Vermont, Hill married Martin Van Buren Knox (1841-1912). In 1873, after their only child, a son, died at birth, they moved to Kansas. Knox graduated with an A.B. from Baker University in Baldwin, Kansas and then was on the faculty for four years, along with her husband. She went to Boston University in 1877 for special studies in English literature and modern languages and received the degree of A. M., with her husband, from the School of All Sciences in 1879. Their duties then took them to the New Hampshire Conference of the Methodist Episcopal Church.

Later, Knox earned a Ph.D. at Allegheny College in Meadville, Pennsylvania and taught for many years at Red River Valley University (Methodist Episcopal), Wahpeton, North Dakota. In addition to being a faculty member, she served as Vice-President, English Language, French and German.

In 1881, she was elected president of the New Hampshire State Woman's Christian Temperance Union (W.C.T.U.) and served in this role for eleven years, her re-election year by year being practically unanimous. For eight years, Vice-President-at-large, North Dakota State W.C.T.U., and for another eight years, as Corresponding secretary, Massachusetts State W.C.T.U. 

Knox's book, Justa Hamlin's Vocation, was published by Abbey Press (1902, New York City). It gave glimpses of the life and work of a minister's wife in a rural community, replete with the pathos and humor enountered by those engaged in philanthropic work. From 1904, she served as managing editor of the W.C.T.U.'s organ, Our Message. She also wrote for religious papers and magazines.

A suffragist, Knox was elected vice-president of the Equal Suffrage Association of North Dakota in 1901 at the organization's annual conference.
 A lecturer, Knox spoke before temperance gatherings while serving the cause of Prohibition. She also lectured at missionary meetings, Chautauqua Assemblies, teachers' conventions, and elsewhere. She was a member of missionary societies (U.S. and foreign), and of the Woman's Literary Club of Wahpeton. Her travels and recreations took her to the Selkirk Mountains, the White Mountains, and the Great Plains.

Rev. Knox died in 1912. In her later years, she resided at Stoneham, Massachusetts with her niece, Nettie Miller and grandniece, Olive Miller. Knox died at the home of another niece, Mrs. Verne F. Miles, Bradford, Vermont, July 28, 1920, having been accompanied there by Nettie and Olive for a vacation.

Selected works
 Justa Hamlin's Vocation, 1902

References

Attribution

External links
 

1845 births
1920 deaths
People from Londonderry, Vermont
Vermont College of Fine Arts alumni
Baker University alumni
Boston University alumni
Allegheny College alumni
Woman's Christian Temperance Union people
Members of the Methodist Episcopal Church
American social reformers
American suffragists
Baker University faculty
20th-century American non-fiction writers
20th-century American women writers
American religious writers
Women religious writers
20th-century American newspaper editors
American women editors
Wikipedia articles incorporating text from A Woman of the Century
American women academics